West Friesland or Westfriesland can refer to the following:

West Friesland (region), a contemporary region in the province of North Holland, Netherlands
The same region as the State of West Friesland in the Dutch Republic
Occasionally, the region where the West Frisian language is spoken, i.e., mostly the province of Friesland in the Netherlands 
West Frisia, the western part of the historical region of Frisia
Westfriesland, a Dutch ship of the line of 78/80 guns of the Admiralty of the Noorderkwartier, built in c. 1666
Westfriesland, a Dutch ship of the line of 90 guns of the Admiralty of the Noorderkwartier, built in 1682